Sir Frederick Phillips, GCMG, CB (18 December 1884 – 14 August 1943) was a British civil servant. 

He was Chairman of the Financial Committee of the League of Nations.

He was head of the British Treasury Mission in Washington D.C. during the Second World War.

References 

1884 births
1943 deaths
Knights Grand Cross of the Order of St Michael and St George
Civil servants in HM Treasury
Alumni of Emmanuel College, Cambridge
Companions of the Order of the Bath
British expatriates in the United States